Te daré lo mejor, recorded live in the city of Tijuana, Baja California, Mexico, is the fifth praise and worship album record by Jesús Adrián Romero. The album was performed in an auditorium with more than 3,000 fans on November 20, 2004.

Track listing
The album consists of the following tracks:
Alzad Oh Puertas - 04:44 - Jesús Adrian Romero
Te Daré Lo Mejor - 05:20 - Jesús Adrián Romero
Tú Nos Creaste - 05:07 - Jesús Adrián Romero, Daniel Fraire
No A Nosotros - 04:54 - Jesús Adrián Romero, Daniel Fraire
Quiero Entender - 06:30 - Jesús Adrián Romero, Mike Rodríguez, Daniel Fraire
Con Brazo Fuerte - 04:07 - Jesús Adrián Romero
Celebraré Tú Amor - 04:46 - Jesús Adrián Romero
Te Vengo A Bendecir - 05:02 - Jesús Adrián Romero, Mike Rodríguez, Daniel Fraire
De Tal Manera - 06:09 - Misael Jimenez - Soloist: Abel Zavala
Abre Los Cielos - 06:33 - Jesús Adrián Romero
Un Destello De Tú Gloria - 05:33 - Jesús Adrián Romero
Tú Estás Aquí - 05:02 - Jesús Adrián Romero, Mike Rodríguez - Duet with Marcela Gandara
Tú Has Sido Fiel - 06:59 - Jesús Adrián Romero, Pecos Romero, Mike Rodríguez, Daniel Fraire
Al Estar Ante Tí - 06:02 - Jesús Adrián Romero, Mike Rodríguez, Daniel Fraire - Soloist: Alejandro del Bosque

Playlists
The following songs from "Te Daré Lo Mejor" were on the following playlists:
Al estar ante Ti at WIGV-LP.
Te daré lo mejor at KMRO.

References

2004 live albums
Jesús Adrián Romero albums
Live gospel albums